Somebody Else's Troubles is an album by singer/songwriter Steve Goodman, released in 1972. The record received favorable reviews but failed to sell. Goodman soon left Buddah Records and signed with Elektra Records. Bob Dylan contributes piano on the title song under the pseudonym of Robert Milkwood Thomas. John Prine is standing second person from left to right. Jimmy Buffett is standing between Prine and Goodman's wife Nancy. The album was reissued in 1999 with two additional tracks.

Reception

Ian Dove of the New York Times wrote, "Mr. Goodman has been allowed to bring all his influences into the album, and as a result we get a fully rounded portrait of the artist. It is a deceptively casual album—'laid back' in the argot—recorded in Nashville and New York, but which has much strength and realism in its simplicity... Mr. Goodman's accompaniment is also kept simple and direct." Robert Christgau assigned it a "B" rating, indicating "...two consecutive songs about racing the sun, which is at least one too many. Tour de force: an a cappella ballad about a Vietnam widow. Arif Mardin found the proper setting for his young man's quaver." In reviewing the 1999 reissue, Allmusic critic Sharon Witmer wrote "This recording presents a good overview of the prodigious talent and gifts that Steve Goodman gave the music world."

Track listing
"The Dutchman" (Michael Peter Smith) – 4:18
"Six Hours Ahead of the Sun" (Steve Goodman) – 4:38
"Song for David" (Goodman) – 3:06
"Chicken Cordon Blues" (Goodman, Paula Ballan, Tony Mandel) – 3:03
"Somebody Else's Troubles" (Goodman) – 3:48
"The Loving of the Game" (Victoria Garvey) – 3:00
"I Ain't Heard You Play No Blues" (Goodman) – 0:56
"Don't Do Me Any Favors Anymore" (Goodman) – 3:33
"The Vegetable Song (The Barn Yard Dance)" (Carl Martin) – 2:38
"Lincoln Park Pirates" (Goodman) – 3:35
"The Ballad of Penny Evans" (Goodman) – 3:37
Reissue bonus tracks:
"I'm My Own Grandpaw" (Goodman, Moe Jaffe, Dwight Latham) – 3:32
"The Auctioneer" (Leroy Van Dyke, Buddy Black) – 5:08

Personnel 
Steve Goodman – vocals, guitar
David Bromberg – dobro, guitar, mandolin
Steve Burgh – bass, guitar, mandolin
Hugh McDonald – bass, guitar
Robert Milkwood Thomas – piano, backing vocals on "Somebody Else's Troubles" [Bob Dylan]
Jeff Gutcheon – keyboards, piano
Arif Mardin – piano
Mark Horowitz – banjo, guitar
Bill Keith – banjo, pedal steel guitar
Hugh McCracken – guitar
Jack McGann – accordion, guitar
Steve Mosley – drums, body percussion
David Brigati – backing vocals
Eddie Brigati – backing vocals
Maria Muldaur – harmony vocals on "Don't Do Me Any Favors Anymore" and "Somebody Else's Troubles"
David "Fathead" Newman – saxophone
Jerry Barnham – flute
Willie Bridges – saxophone
Larry Packer – fiddle
Kenny Kosek – fiddle
Charles McCracken – cello

Production
Arif Mardin – producer, remixing
Malcolm Addey – engineer
Joel Kerr – engineer
Eddie Youngblood – engineer
Harry Yarmark – engineer
Michael O'Sullivan – photography
Gib Foster – design

References

External links
"Hidden Treasures: Steve Goodman—Somebody Else's Troubles", The Guardian

Steve Goodman albums
1972 albums
Albums produced by Arif Mardin